Gillmeria irakella is a moth of the family Pterophoridae that can be found in Turkey, Iraq and Iran.

References

Moths described in 1959
Platyptiliini
Moths of Asia